Miroslava "Mirka" Federer (born Miroslava Vavrincová on 1 April 1978, later Miroslava Vavrinec) is a Swiss former professional tennis player.

She is married to tennis player Roger Federer, having first met him at the 2000 Summer Olympics. She retired from professional tennis in 2002 due to a persistent foot injury. By the time she closed her career, she was a top-100 ranked player.

Early life and tennis career
Born in Bojnice (then Czechoslovakia), Miroslava emigrated to Switzerland when she was two years old. In 1987, when she was nine, her father took her to watch a tournament at Filderstadt in Germany. Mirka met Martina Navratilova, who thought she looked athletic and should try tennis. Navratilova later sent her a racquet and arranged for her first tennis lesson.

In 2002, she teamed up with Roger Federer in the Hopman Cup. Her best Grand Slam performance was in 2001, when she reached the third round of the US Open. Monica Seles defeated her twice. 

However, a recurring foot injury prevented Vavrinec from progressing further up the rankings, eventually forcing her retirement from competitive tennis in 2002. Following her retirement, she took on the role of Federer's public relations manager, traveling with him on tour, often seen attending his matches.
Prior to her retirement, she was ranked in the mid-80s, with a career high of No. 76, during the 2001 season.

Personal life
Mirka married Roger Federer on 11 April 2009. They were married at Wenkenhof Villa in Riehen near Basel, surrounded by a small group of close friends and family. In 2009, Mirka gave birth to identical twin girls, Myla and Charlene. The Federers had another set of twins in 2014, this time fraternal twin boys, Leo and Lenny.

Grand Slam singles performance timeline

ITF Circuit finals

Singles: 13 (3–10)

Doubles: 4 (1–3)

References

External links

 
 
 

1978 births
Living people
Sportspeople from Bojnice
Swiss people of Slovak descent
Swiss female tennis players
Tennis players at the 2000 Summer Olympics
Mirka
Hopman Cup competitors
Czechoslovak emigrants to Switzerland
Olympic tennis players of Switzerland